The Boys is a comic book series, written by Garth Ennis and co-created, designed, and illustrated by Darick Robertson. The first volume was published by WildStorm, who canceled it after six issues; the series was picked up by Dynamite Entertainment, which published the following eight volumes. Debuting in October 2006, the series concluded in November 2012 after 72 issues were published. In the fourth volume, the series is revealed to be set in the same fictional universe as Ennis' previous 1995–2000 DC Vertigo series, Preacher, with former vampire Proinsias Cassidy cameoing as a bartender. Three 6-issue spin-off limited series were also produced during the series' original run: Herogasm, Highland Laddie, and Butcher, Baker, Candlestickmaker, with an 8-issue epilogue series, Dear Becky, published from January–December 2020.

The book was adapted by Amazon Studios and Sony Pictures Television into a streaming television series that premiered on Amazon Prime Video on July 26, 2019, through a brand licensing rights agreement with Dynamite Entertainment, from which a franchise was launched—web series Seven on 7 with Cameron Coleman, which premiered July 7, 2021—spin-off animated anthology series, Diabolical, which premiered on March 4, 2022 (of which the third episode, "I'm Your Pusher", is set in the same continuity as the comic series)—and live-action spin-off series Gen V, which is set to premiere in 2023.

Publication history
The first six issues of The Boys were published by Wildstorm, starting in 2006. On January 24, 2007, the series was abruptly canceled with issue 6. Ennis later explained that this was because DC Comics (of which Wildstorm was an imprint before it was disbanded) were uneasy with the anti-superhero tone of the work. The planned collection of said issues was also canceled. Co-creator Darick Robertson said that "DC is being good about reverting our rights so we can find a new publisher and we're in the process of doing that now". Ennis then released a statement that some other publishers had expressed interest, and that issue 7 and a trade paperback of the first six issues would be available. While  Robertson was on exclusive contract to DC, he was given special dispensation to continue working on The Boys. In February 2007 the series was picked up by Dynamite Entertainment and it resumed in May. A collected edition of the first six issues was also published by Dynamite, with a foreword by Simon Pegg. Pegg was the model on whom the character Hughie was based in the way he was drawn in the comics by Robertson.

In February 2009, Dynamite announced a spin-off mini-series, Herogasm, with art from John McCrea and Keith Burns; subsequent miniseries included Highland Laddie and Butcher, Baker, Candlestick Maker, with the three series each later being compiled as volumes of The Boys.

After The Boys was completed, Ennis told CBR.com that the comic had benefitted from Wildstorm cancelling it, in that Dynamite gave him far more freedom than DC ever would have, saying, "We'd have died on the vine [at DC]. The book would have been chipped and chipped away at until writing it was pure frustration." He also admitted to "a sigh of relief" as Wildstorm had been dissolved as an imprint not long after the move.

An eight-issue epilogue series, Dear Becky, was published from June to November 2020.

Plot
The series is set between 2006 and 2008 in a world where superheroes exist. However, most of the superheroes in the series' universe are corrupted by their celebrity status and often engage in reckless behavior, compromising the safety of the world. The story follows a small clandestine CIA squad, informally known as "The Boys", led by Billy Butcher and comprising Mother's Milk, the Frenchman, the Female, and new addition "Wee" Hughie Campbell, who are charged with monitoring the superhero community, often leading to gruesome confrontations and dreadful results; in parallel, a key subplot follows Annie "Starlight" January, a young and naive superhero who joins the Seven, the most prestigious—and corrupted—superhero group in the world and The Boys' most powerful enemies.

Characters

Collected editions
Dynamite releases both hardcover and trade paperback collections on an ongoing basis (including those comics previously published by Wildstorm). In addition, Dynamite also releases "Definitive" slipcased hardcovers, which contain two trade/hardcover collections to an "omnibus."

Definitive Editions

Awards
 2008: Nominated, "Best Continuing Series", Eisner Award.
 2009: Nominated, "Comic Book of the Year Under $3.00", Diamond Comic Distributor Gem Awards.
 2010: Nominated, "Best Comic Book or Graphic Novel", Scream Awards.

Adaptations

Scrapped film
Variety reported in February 2008 that Columbia Pictures had optioned the comic for a film adaptation, to be produced by Neal H. Moritz. and Phil Hay and Matt Manfredi writing the screenplay. In August 2010, Adam McKay said that he had been signed on to direct the film. McKay added, "They already have a script and we're doing a rewrite on it so hopefully getting the whole thing into shape in the Fall with maybe a shoot happening in January." Columbia Pictures reported in February 2012 that it had dropped its option regarding a film adaptation of The Boys. However, Adam McKay said in a Twitter response that Paramount Pictures had picked it up, and that it was still in the works. On April 30, 2013, Manfredi and Hay were hired by Paramount to write the film, though the project never came to fruition.

Television series

In October 2015 it was reported that Cinemax greenlit a television series adaptation of The Boys, and that Seth Rogen, Evan Goldberg and Eric Kripke were producing the series. In September 2017, Variety reported that Amazon Studios had picked up the series. The series premiered on July 26, 2019. The second season premiered on September 4, 2020, while the third season premiered on June 3, 2022.

Audiobook series
All 98 issues of the comic series have been adapted into 7 audiobooks produced with a full cast of actors, immersive sound effects and cinematic music by GraphicAudio. Volume 1 was released on May 4, 2020. Volume 7 adapts the Dear Becky epilogue series and concluded the audiobook production on May 20, 2022. The entire series lasts 31 hours, retains the 2006–2008 setting and the dialogue is a very close match to Garth Ennis´ original scripts. The content rating is Ages 18+.

Animated series

An animated spin-off series of The Boys, The Boys Presents: Diabolical, was released on March 4, 2022.

"We Gotta Go Now" adaptation

A live-action spin-off series of The Boys, Gen V (formerly The Boys Presents: Varsity), serving as a stand-alone adaptation of the "We Gotta Go Now" arc from the comic series, focused on the G-Men and inspired by The Hunger Games, was announced on September 20, 2020, set for a 2023 release.

References

External links
 Sullivan, Michael Patrick (April 19, 2007). "The Boys" Are Back in Town: Ennis & Robertson Speak. CBR.com.
 

 
2006 comics debuts
2012 comics endings
Comics adapted into television series
Comics by Garth Ennis
Comics critical of religion
Comics set in New York City
Dynamite Entertainment titles
Superhero comics